Deifontes is a municipality located in the province of Granada, Spain. According to the 2006 census (INE), the city had a population of 2478 inhabitants.

References

Municipalities in the Province of Granada